Timothy Henry Hoʻolulu Pitman (March 18, 1845 – February 27, 1863) was an American Union Army soldier of Native Hawaiian descent. Considered one of the "Hawaiʻi Sons of the Civil War", he was among a group of more than one hundred documented Native Hawaiian and Hawaii-born combatants who fought in the American Civil War while the Kingdom of Hawaiʻi was still an independent nation.

Born and raised in Hilo, Hawaiʻi, he was the eldest son of Kinoʻoleoliliha, a Hawaiian high chiefess, and Benjamin Pitman, an American pioneer settler from Massachusetts. Through his father's business success in the whaling and sugar and coffee plantation industries and his mother's familial connections to the Hawaiian royal family, the Pitmans were quite prosperous and owned lands on the island of Hawaiʻi and in Honolulu. He and his older sister Mary were educated in the mission schools in Hilo alongside other children of mixed Hawaiian descent. After the death of his mother in 1855, his father remarried to the widow of a missionary, thus connecting the family to the American missionary community in Hawaiʻi. However, following the deaths of his first wife and later his second wife, his father decided to leave the islands and returned to Massachusetts with his family in 1861. The younger Pitman continued his education in the public schools of Roxbury, where the Pitman family lived for a period of time.

Leaving school without his family's knowledge, he made the decision to fight in the Civil War in August 1862. Despite his mixed-race ancestry, Pitman avoided the racial segregation imposed on other Native Hawaiian recruits of the time and enlisted in the 22nd Regiment Massachusetts Volunteer Infantry, a white regiment. He served as a private in the Union Army fighting in the Battle of Antietam and the Maryland Campaign. In his company, Private Robert G. Carter befriended the part-Hawaiian soldier and wrote in later life of their common experience in the 22nd Massachusetts. Compiled decades afterward from old letters, Carter's account described the details surrounding his final fate in the war. On the march to Fredericksburg, Pitman was separated from his regiment and captured by Confederate guerrilla forces. He was forced to march to Richmond and incarcerated in the Confederate Libby Prison, where he contracted "lung fever" from the harsh conditions of his imprisonment and died on February 27, 1863, a few months after his release on parole in a prisoner exchange. Modern historians consider Henry Hoʻolulu Pitman to be the only known Hawaiian or Pacific Islander to die as a prisoner of war in the Civil War.

For a period of time after the end of the war, the legacy and contributions of Pitman and other documented Hawaiian participants in the American Civil War were largely forgotten except in the private circles of descendants and historians. However, there has been a revival of interest in recent years in the Hawaiian community. In 2010, these "Hawaiʻi Sons of the Civil War" were commemorated with a bronze plaque erected along the memorial pathway at the National Memorial Cemetery of the Pacific in Honolulu.

Early life and family

Timothy Henry Hoʻolulu Pitman was born March 18, 1845, in Hilo, Hawaiʻi, the first son and second child of Benjamin Pitman and Kinoʻoleoliliha. Originally a native of Salem, Massachusetts, Pitman's father was an early pioneer, businessman and sugar and coffee plantation owner on the island of Hawaiʻi, who profited greatly from the kingdom's booming whaling industry in the early 1800s. On his father's side, he was a great-grandson of Joshua Pitman (1755–1822), an English-American carpenter on the ship Franklin under Captain Allen Hallett during the American Revolutionary War. On his mother's side, Pitman was a descendant of Kameʻeiamoku, one of the royal twins (with Kamanawa) who advised Kamehameha I in his conquest of the Hawaiian Islands, and also of the early American or English sea captain Harold Cox, who lent his name to George "Cox" Kahekili Keʻeaumoku II, the Governor of Maui. Henry Hoʻolulu Pitman shared his Hawaiian name with his maternal grandfather Hoʻolulu who, along with his brother Hoapili, helped conceal the bones of King Kamehameha I in a secret hiding place after his death. In the Hawaiian language, the name "Hoʻolulu" means "to lie in the sheltered waters". His siblings were Mary Pitman Ailau (1838–1905), Benjamin Franklin Keolaokalani Pitman (1852–1918) and half-sister Maria Kinoʻole Pitman Morey (1858–1892).

Because of his father's success in business and his mother's descent from Hawaiian royalty, the Pitman family was considered quite prosperous and were host to the royal family when they visited Hilo. Besides being one of the leading merchants in town, his father also served the government as district magistrate of Hilo. Henry's mother, Kinoʻole, had inherited control over much of the lands in Hilo and Ōlaʻa from her own father, and King Kamehameha III had granted her use of the ahupuaʻa of Hilo after her marriage. During Henry's early childhood, the family lived in the mansion that Benjamin Pitman had built in 1840, in an area known as Niopola, one of the favored resort spots of ancient Hawaiian royalty. The residence also became known as the Spencer House after Pitman sold it to his business partner Captain Thomas Spencer. The property later became the site of the Hilo Hotel, built in 1888 and torn down in 1956. In the 1850s the family moved to the capital of Honolulu where Benjamin Pitman took up banking and built a beautiful two-story house that he named Waialeale ("rippling water") at the corner of Alakea and Beretania Streets.

Education

While in Hawaiʻi, Pitman and his older sister Mary attended Mrs. Wetmore's children's school in Hilo. The school was located at the Wetmores' residence on Church Street. Taught by Lucy Sheldon Taylor Wetmore, the wife of American missionary doctor and government physician Charles Hinckley Wetmore, who had come to Hawaii in 1848 with the American Board of Commissioners for Foreign Missions (ABCFM), the two elder Pitman children received their education in English rather than Hawaiian. This was unusual since Hawaiian was the official language of the Kingdom of Hawaiʻi, and all other schools in Hilo were conducted in the Hawaiian language. Mrs. Wetmore taught the children reading, writing, spelling, arithmetic and singing, while also reinforcing the curriculum with a strong adherence to the principles of the Protestant faith. Like the Pitman siblings, many of their classmates were also of half-Hawaiian (hapa-kanaka) descent with a majority of them being Chinese-Hawaiians (hapa-pake).

After the death of his mother Kinoʻole in 1855, Pitman's father remarried to Maria Louisa Walsworth Kinney, the widow of American missionary Rev. Henry Kinney. The Kinneys were part of the Twelfth Company of missionaries from the ABCFM to arrive in 1848. The marriage aligned the Pitman children with the American missionary community. They were called "cousins" by the children of the missionaries and considered part of the extended missionary family of Hawaiʻi. This first stepmother died in 1858 after giving birth to their father's fourth child, a daughter named Maria Kinoʻole (1858–1892). The Pitman family returned to Massachusetts in 1861 after his father remarried to his third wife Martha Ball, giving his four children another stepmother. Letters by traveler Sophia Cracroft, niece of Lady Jane Franklin, indicated that the Pitman family left for San Francisco, on June 25, 1861, aboard the ship Comet with Cracroft and Lady Franklin and that the elder Pitman "now has a third wife with a baby [Charles Brook Pitman]." According to an 1887 biography written by Robert G. Carter, a private who would later serve in the same company as Pitman, he was neglected after his mother's death by his father and stepmother, who "subjected [him] to neglect and treatment, that with his sensitive nature he could not bear". He continued his education in the public schools of Roxbury, where the Pitman family lived for a period of time. He have proceeded the family in leaving Hawaii. The 1860 United States Census registered Pitman under his teacher Solomon Adams as residing and presumably being educated in Newton, also in the Boston area.

Growing into adolescence, he was said to strongly resemble his Hawaiian mother. His enlistment card during the war noted he had a dark complexion, hazel colored eyes, black hair and stood five feet eight inches. Robert G. Carter gave a brief description of his appearance in wartime letters first published in 1897:
[A] tall, slim boy, straight as an arrow. His face was a perfect oval, his hair was as black as a raven's wing, and his eyes were large and of that peculiar soft, melting blackness, which excites pity when one is in distress. His skin was a clear, dark olive, bordering on the swarthy, and this, with his high cheek bones, would have led us to suppose that his nationality was different from our own, had we not known that his name was plain Henry P. There was an air of good breeding and refinement about him, that, with his small hands and feet, would have set us to thinking, had it not been that in our youth and intensely enthusiastic natures, we gave no thought to our comrades' personal appearance. We can look back now and see the shy, reserved nature of the boy, the dark, melancholy eyes, the sad smile, the sensitive twitching of the lips.

American Civil War
After the outbreak of the American Civil War, the Kingdom of Hawaiʻi under King Kamehameha IV declared its neutrality on August 26, 1861. But many Native Hawaiians and Hawaiian-born Americans (mainly descendants of the American missionaries), both abroad and in the islands, volunteered and enlisted in the military regiments of various states in the Union and the Confederacy. Individual Native Hawaiians had been serving in the United States Navy and Army since the War of 1812, and even more served during the Civil War. Many Hawaiians sympathized with the Union because of Hawaiʻi's ties to New England through its missionaries and the whaling industry, and the ideological opposition of many to the institution of slavery.

Enlistment and service

On August 14, 1862, Pitman left school without his family's knowledge and volunteered to serve in the Union Army and fight in the Civil War. He apparently never informed his family in advance about the choice to join the war, because the news of his enlistment was reported back in Hawaiʻi's American missionary community as "Henry Pitman has run away from home and gone [to war]." Carter described Pitman's rationale for enlisting: "In the midst of the clamor of war, when the very air vibrated with excitement, the wild enthusiasm of the crowds, and the inspiring sound of the drum, his Indian nature rose within him. His resolve was made."

Pitman was a hapa-haole, of part Hawaiian and part Caucasian descent. His father was white and his native-born mother was also part Caucasian from her own mother, who was the daughter of Captain Cox and a Hawaiian chiefess. Despite his mixed-race ancestry, Pitman avoided the racial segregation imposed on other Native Hawaiian volunteers in this period. Most Native Hawaiians who participated in the war were assigned to colored regiments, but Pitman's fair skin color meant he was able to serve in a white unit, indicating that unit assignment may have been influenced by how dark Hawaiians appeared. Historians Bob Dye, James L. Haley and others claimed Pitman was placed in the colored regiments because of his mixed race, but regiment records indicate otherwise.

Pitman served as a private in the 22nd Regiment Massachusetts Volunteer Infantry, Company H. This regiment was also named the "Henry Wilson's Regiment" after Colonel and U.S. Senator Henry Wilson, who commanded the unit in 1861. Colonel William S. Tilton was the regimental commander during Pitman's brief term of service. The regiment was part of the V Corps of the Army of the Potomac under the senior command of Major General George B. McClellan. During this period, the regiment fought in the Second Battle of Bull Run and was involved in the Maryland Campaign fighting in the Battle of Antietam, the bloodiest single-day battle in American history, and the Battle of Shepherdstown. His regiment was on the march to the Battle of Fredericksburg when Pitman was captured by Confederate troops.

Imprisonment and death

The most detailed account of Pitman's final fate in the war came from Robert G. Carter. In November 1862, Pitman was captured near Warrenton Junction on the march toward Fredericksburg, Virginia, during the weeks prior to the Battle of Fredericksburg. He had fallen behind the group because his feet had blistered and swollen due to the tightness of "a pair of thin, high-heeled and narrow soled boots" he had purchased. One of his comrades temporarily stayed behind to care for him but later decided to move on with the rest of the camp for fear of disciplinary consequences of falling out without authority. He was urged to move on, but without much success. Pitman's last words to his comrade were, "I will be in camp by night, good by." His fellow soldiers never saw him again and considered him missing. Shortly after he was left, a band of Confederate guerrillas under Colonel John S. Mosby captured the weary and defenseless soldier without a struggle. The inscription on his tombstone differs slightly from Carter's account, stating he was captured by J. E. B. Stuart's cavalry instead.

After Pitman's capture, he was marched to Richmond in a weak physical state. He was imprisoned in the Confederate Libby Prison and Belle Isle, which were notoriously harsh prisons. Pitman's letters home described his place of incarceration as the "Pen" where "the filthy meat [was] thrown to them as if they were dogs". The condition of his incarceration including the shortage of food, lack of sanitation, overcrowding and his physical weakness made him susceptible to virulent diseases present in the Confederate prisons. Carter described how the prisons "wore out the brave spirit". During a prisoner exchange, Pitman was released by the Confederate Army at City Point, Virginia, on December 12, 1862, and then sent to Camp Parole, Annapolis. Suffering from complications due to the conditions of his imprisonment, he contracted "lung fever", which was perhaps pneumonia. Carter wrote later how his friend had "linger[ed] feebly a few weeks, like the flickering of an expiring flame, then quietly pass[ed] away to an eternal life". Pitman died at Camp Parole on February 27, 1863, just weeks short of his eighteenth birthday. According to historians Anita Manning and Justin Vance, Pitman "has the unfortunate distinction of being the only known Hawaiian or Pacific Islander to die as a prisoner of war in the Civil War".

Considering him missing, Pitman's regiment did not discover his final fate until news of his funeral at Roxbury was received in the spring of the following year. His remains were returned to his family in Massachusetts after his death in Camp Parole. Benjamin Pitman, his father, had him buried in a family plot in Mount Auburn Cemetery. On one side of the Pitman family grave marker was placed the inscription:

Timothy Henry PitmanBorn at Hilo, HawaiiMar. 18, 1845Died at Camp ParoleAnnapolis, MD, Feb'y 27, 1863Aged 17 years 11 mos. 9 daysA member of Co. H, 22nd RegimentMass. Vols., was with his Regiment in thebattles of South Mountain, Antietam and Sharpsburg. Was taken prisoner by Stuart'scavalry on the march to Fredricksburg [sic];Imprisoned in Libby Prison, paroled andsent to Camp Parole, Annapolis, and died incamp of pneumonia.

Legacy
After his death, the memory of Henry Hoʻolulu Pitman was honored by friends and family members back in Massachusetts and Hawaiʻi. During a return to Hawaiʻi in 1917, his younger brother Benjamin Keolaokalani Pitman and his wife Almira Hollander Pitman discovered a grandson of a nephew was named Kealiʻi i Kaua i Pakoma (meaning "Chief that fought the Potomac") in honor of his deceased older brother. Similarly, Henry Hoʻolulu Pitman Beckley, the second son of his Hawaiian first cousin George Charles Moʻoheau Beckley, a grandson of Captain George Charles Beckley, was also named after him. Shortly after his death, Pitman was eulogized back in Hawaiʻi by Martha Ann Chamberlain, Corresponding Secretary of the Hawaiian Mission Children's Society:
Our cousin, Henry Pitman, the first of Hawaii's sons to fall in the war, died at Annapolis Parole Camp, Feb. 27, of lung fever, serving as a soldier in the Union army. His remains were deposited in Mt. Auburn Cemetery, near Boston, Mass. He died in a just cause. Let his memory be embalmed among our band.

After the war, the military service of Hawaiians, including Henry Hoʻolulu Pitman, were largely forgotten, disappearing from the collective memories of the American Civil War and the history of Hawaiʻi. However, in recent years, Hawaiian residents and historians and descendants of Hawaiian combatants in the conflict have insisted on the need to remember "our boys from Hawaii". Renewed interest in the stories of these individuals and this particular period of Hawaiian-American history have inspired efforts to preserve the memories of the Hawaiians who served in the war. On August 26, 2010, on the anniversary of the signing of the Hawaiian Neutrality Proclamation, a bronze plaque was erected along the memorial pathway at the National Memorial Cemetery of the Pacific in Honolulu recognizing these "Hawaiʻi Sons of the Civil War", the more than one hundred documented Hawaiians who served during the American Civil War for both the Union and the Confederacy. Pitman's great-grandniece Diane Kinoʻole o Liliha Pitman Spieler attended the ceremony. Pitman Spieler stated, "I'm very proud of a young man of his age – he was quite young – who served in the Civil War for his family."

In 2013, Todd Ocvirk, Nanette Napoleon, Justin Vance, Anita Manning and others began the process of creating a historical documentary film about the individual experiences and stories of Hawaii-born soldiers and sailors of the Civil War, including Pitman, Samuel C. Armstrong, Nathaniel Bright Emerson, James Wood Bush, J. R. Kealoha and many other unnamed combatants of both the Union and the Confederacy. In 2014, Maui-based author Wayne Moniz wrote a fictionalized story based on the lives and Civil War service of Hawaiian soldiers like Henry Hoʻolulu Pitman in his book Pukoko: A Hawaiian in the American Civil War. In 2015, the sesquicentennial of the end of the war, the National Park Service released a publication titled Asians and Pacific Islanders and the Civil War about the service of the large number of combatants of Asian and Pacific Islander descent who fought during the war. The history of Hawaiʻi's involvement and the biographies of Pitman, Bush, Kealoha and others were co-written by historians Anita Manning and Justin Vance.

See also
 Hawaii and the American Civil War
 Massachusetts in the American Civil War

Notes

References

Bibliography

Books and journals

Newspapers and online sources

Further reading

External links

 
 
 
 

1845 births
1863 deaths
American military personnel of Native Hawaiian descent
Union Army soldiers
People of the Hawaiian Kingdom in the American Civil War
People of Massachusetts in the American Civil War
American Civil War prisoners of war
Union military personnel killed in the American Civil War
Hawaiian Kingdom people
People from Hilo, Hawaii
People from Roxbury, Boston
Deaths from pneumonia in Maryland
Burials at Mount Auburn Cemetery